The Sea Is Full of Stars is the ninth novel in the Well of Souls series by American author Jack L. Chalker.

External links
 
 The Sea Is Full of Stars at Worlds Without End

1999 American novels
1999 science fiction novels
American science fiction novels
Novels by Jack L. Chalker
Del Rey books